Carl Kockelkorn (November 26, 1843 in Cologne – July 16, 1914 in Cologne) was a German chess composer. Together with Johannes Kohtz he founded the logical school of chess compositions.

His problems were published as coproductions with Johannes Kohtz. For further information, see Johannes Kohtz#Kohtz and Kockelkorn.

In his early years he called himself Kannengießer after the name of his stepfather. Kockelkorn worked as a private tutor in Cologne.

Sources 
 Herbert Grasemann: Eines Reverends Einfall, der Geschichte machte (reprint of articles from Deutsche Schachblätter). p. 16-17

1843 births
1914 deaths
Chess composers
German chess players
Sportspeople from Cologne
People from the Rhine Province
19th-century chess players